Avissawella, is a township in Sri Lanka, governed by an Urban Council, situated on the A4 route from Colombo to Ratnapura, Colombo District, Western Province, Sri Lanka, approximately 40 km air distance and 48.1 km road distance from east of capital Colombo. It is also known as Seethawakapura.

Overview 

It is on the periphery of the Western Province on its border with the Sabaragamuwa Province.

This town has a rich and proud history in the annals of its military exploits against the Portuguese invaders as it was the capital of Sitawaka Kingdom from 1521 to 1593. Seethawaka was ruled by King Mayadunne and later his son Rajasinghe the First during this period. There is a lore that Rajasinghe was a parricide but some historians discount this as a story spread by jealousy.

Avissawella is the junction from where the oldest land route to the Hill Country via Hatton and the road down South via Ratnapura diverge. The Kelani Valley Railway line was originally built from Colombo to Yatiyanthota via Avissawella during 1900–1902. It was branched off at Avissawella and extended up to Opanayaka via Ratnapura (completed in 1912). Originally it was built as a 2 ft 6 in (762 mm) narrow-gauge[1] line to serve the rubber plantations in the area. The railway line between Avissawella and Yatiyanthota was removed in 1942, and the line from Homagama to Opanayaka abandoned in 1973.
The railway services were restarted up to Avissawella in 1978 and is now a broad gauge line.

Avissawella has few tourist attractions. Kumari waterfall (Kumari ella) is very famous since it is only few kilometers from the capital city.  

The town is governed by the Seethawakapura (formerly Avissawella) Urban Council.

During the past, this area was known as Seethawaka and this name is used to identify a section of this town to this day.  There are folklore which relate this name to "Seetha Devi" of Ramayanaya fame. Seethawaka legend has become richer because of these stories. Seethawaka river, a tributary of the Kelani river, flows in the outskirts of the city. 
The city is rapidly transforming into an industrial city with the establishment of the Seethawaka Export Promotion Zone (industrial zone) during late 1990s. After this Zone was established, the population of Avissawella increased rapidly due to migrant workers and resultant increase in residents.

See also 

 List of railway stations in Sri Lanka
 Kelani Valley Railway Line

References 

Populated places in Western Province, Sri Lanka
Grama Niladhari divisions of Sri Lanka